The Canon EF 35-70mm 3.5-4.5 is an EF mount wide-to-normal zoom lens. It is one of the first lenses in the Canon EF series. It has the same zoom system and 9 lenses in 8 groups layout as the Canon New FD 35-70mm f/3.5-4.5 although it is unclear whether the actual optical design is identical.

In October 1988, Canon announced the EF 35-70mm 3.5-4.5A lens. This lens has similar physical values, but was sold at a lower price.

Specifications

References

External links 

Canon EF lenses
Camera lenses introduced in 1987
Camera lenses introduced in 1988